The Geisha and the Samurai is a 1919 German silent film directed by Carl Boese.

Cast
Ernst Deutsch
Werner Hollmann
Sybill Morel
Gertrude Welcker

References

External links

Films of the Weimar Republic
Films directed by Carl Boese
German silent feature films
German black-and-white films
1910s German films